Wilbur H. Grant (1897–1983) was a judge and state legislator in Indiana. He was a veteran and a Republican. He represented Indianapolis in Marion County in the Indiana House of Representatives from 1943 to 1947. He was succeeded by Forrest W. Littlejohn.

See also
List of African-American officeholders (1900–1959)

References

1897 births
1983 deaths
Republican Party members of the Indiana House of Representatives